Samsung Galaxy S II WiMAX ISW11SC is a smartphone developed by Samsung Electronics, and sold by au in Japan.

It is the first phone in the Galaxy series, and is the final model to be compliant with the WiMAX Standard. It supports Wi-Fi tethering. It is one of a series of smartphones compatible with CDMA 1X WIN. Its production model number is SCI 11. The manufacturer's model number is SCH-J001.

Characteristics 
It is the first model of Galaxy series to feature near-field communication (NFC). However, it is not compatible with Osaifu-Keitai. 

The Ver.001 IC card can be used for regular communication, but if it is used for authentication of NFC function, it needs to be replaced with the ver.002 - a card with brown and white stripes. Normal cards that are the size of ver.002 are supported by adding a terminal.

The user interface adopts Samsung's original TouchWiz 4.0 UX.

The logo (cursive style design) uses a new typeface stamped sequentially from models of 2012 spring model and later including this model. The logo appears immediately after startup and displays the text "au".

This phone is neither IP67 and IP68 certified which means it is neither water nor dust-proof.

The "KDDI E-mail application" pre-installed in this model is different from the "KDDI E-mail application" installed in the Fall / Winter 2011 model · Xperia acro (IS 11 S) · HTC EVO WiMAX (ISW 11 HT). A ringtone can be set to something other than preset.

History 
 January 16, 2012 (Heisei 24)  - Official announcement from KDDI and Samsung Telecommunications Japan.
 January 20, 2012 - Noble black is released all over the country. 
 February 16, 2012 - 1st Software Update Start. 
 March 24, 2012 - Ceramic White is additionally released in the Chubu area. 
 March 25, 2012 - Ceramic white is additionally released in the Kanto area. 
 March 28, 2012 - Ceramic white is additionally released in China, Kyushu, Okinawa area. 
 March 30, 2012 - Ceramic white is additionally released in the remaining districts other than the above. 
 May 15, 2012 - Shiny Magenta announced additional. 
 May 22, 2012 - 2nd Software Update Start. 2012 
 July 20 - Shiny Magenta is additionally released at Chubu, Hokuriku, Shikoku and Kyushu areas. 
 July 21, 2012 - Shiny Magenta is additionally released in Hokkaido, Tohoku, Kanto, Kansai and China. 
 July 25, 2012 - Shiny Magenta is additionally released in the Okinawa area. 
 August 16, 2012 - 3rd Software Update Start.
 September 13, 2012 - 4th Software Update (Version upgrade to Android 4.0.4 begins.) 
 September 15, 2012 - Because some defects were confirmed in software, we temporarily suspended updates to Android 4.0.4.
 October 2, 2012 - Fifth software update (Resume updating to Android 4.0.4.) 
 February 14, 2013 - 6th software update start.

Main functions / services 
* A PC web browser is equipped as standard and Flash contents can be displayed fully. The mobile site (EZWeb) cannot be viewed like any other smartphone or PC.

 Safe security pack is full compliant

Update 
 A February 16, 2012 mobile update fixed problems with turning the phone on. 
 On May 22, 2012 another update increased the phone's range, while. 
 On August 16, 2012 a display problem when SMS (C Mail) is received was remedied.
 On February 14, 2013 a problem with microSD card initialization was fixed. 
 On April 25, 2013 a problem that prevented sending and receiving e-mail was fixed.
 The upgrade to Android 4.0.4 began on September 13, 2012, but it was stopped temporarily on 15 September 2012 to correct a problem. The upgrade was resumed on October 2, 2012. The Bluetooth version changed from 3.0 + HS to 3.0 + EDR. The au widget was added. It was security pack compatible. International calling + code calling function was added. Configuration change of setting menu Items of the setting menu are changed. Items such as "data use" and "development" increased. The data usage of each application can be viewed. The option menu, music player and video application menu changed. Restart was added to the OFF menu. The email application was improved.

See also 
 Samsung Electronics
 Samsung Galaxy
 Samsung Galaxy S II

References

External links 
 ISW11SC (au)
 ISW11SC (SAMSUNG)
 Samsung Galaxy S II WiMAX ISW11SC specifications and reviews (www.esato.com)

Samsung Galaxy
Samsung smartphones
Samsung mobile phones